Terence Charles Yorath (born 27 March 1950) is a Welsh former football player and manager at both club and international level. He is the father of television presenter Gabby Logan.

He represented Leeds United, Coventry City, Tottenham Hotspur, Vancouver Whitecaps, Bradford City, Swansea City and the Welsh national team. He later became a football manager for Bradford City, Swansea City, Cardiff City and Sheffield Wednesday, as well as assistant at Huddersfield Town. Yorath also managed the Wales and Lebanon national teams.

Club career

Early career
Yorath was an apprentice at Leeds United signing professional forms at the age of 17. Along with other Leeds midfield players of the time, such as Mick Bates and Terry Hibbitt, he found it difficult to establish himself ahead of Don Revie's preferred pairing of Billy Bremner and Johnny Giles. Between 1967 and 1972 he made just 14 League appearances for Leeds.

Leeds United
In the 1972–73 season, injuries and suspensions allowed Yorath to establish himself as a first team regular. However, his first season ended with two cup final runners-up medals; he was a substitute in the 1973 FA Cup Final, which Leeds lost 1–0 to Sunderland, and also appeared in the 1973 UEFA Cup Winners' Cup Final, which Leeds lost in controversial circumstances to AC Milan.

Yorath finally won some silverware the following 1973–74 season, where he was a key member of the Leeds championship winning side. Yorath became the first Welshman to play in a European Cup final when Leeds reached the final of the UEFA European Cup, but again Yorath ended up with a runners up medal as Leeds lost 2–0 to Bayern Munich in controversial circumstances.

Don Revie had left Leeds to manage England, and his eventual replacement Jimmy Armfield decided to dispense with Yorath's services in 1976, selling him to Coventry City for £125,000. During his time with Leeds, Yorath made 120 appearances and scored ten goals.

Coventry City
Yorath would be captain to one of only a handful of top flight Coventry City sides that spent an entire season in the top ten. Spearheaded by the prolific strike partnership of Ian Wallace and Mick Ferguson, and ably abetted by the legendary winger Tommy Hutchison and attacking full backs Graham Oakey and Bobby MacDonald, the Sky Blues would enjoy a 7th-place finish in the 1977–78 season, narrowly missing out on European football. Yorath's Coventry side containing such notables as Alan Green, McDonald and Mick Coop are still fondly remembered even today by the Sky Blue faithful. A remarkable 5–4 win over Norwich City at Highfield Road, Christmas 1977, replete with bicycle kick by Ian Wallace and last gasp penalty save by Jim Blyth, lives long in Coventry folklore.

Yorath remained at Coventry for three years, playing 99 games and scoring three goals and was captain for most of this period. He moved onto Tottenham Hotspur in 1979 for £300,000, and then briefly to Vancouver Whitecaps in 1981, where he made 59 appearances, scoring four goals in his two seasons with the club.

International career
Yorath picked up the first of 59 Welsh caps in 1970 against Italy, and he maintained a regular presence in the international side until 1981. Yorath also captained his country on 42 occasions.

Managerial career
In 1982, Yorath joined Bradford City as player/assistant coach. He was injured during the Bradford City stadium fire disaster in 1985 when he was forced to jump out of a window after evacuating supporters from a bar. He subsequently took up the manager's position at Swansea City in 1986 (making a single and final league appearance), and led the club to promotion from the Division Four to the Division Three at the end of the 1987–88 season.

In 1989, he was appointed part-time manager of Wales, eventually taking up the post on a full-time basis whilst still managing Swansea. However, this caused conflict with the club, and Yorath left Swansea to manage Bradford. He was dismissed by Bradford after just one year in charge, and returned to manage Swansea again.

In 1991, after a run of nine consecutive defeats, he left Swansea for a second time to concentrate on managing Wales. Yorath was popular amongst the Wales players and fans and guided them to wins over Brazil in 1990 and World Cup holders Germany in a European Championship Qualifier in 1991. Under Yorath, Wales attained what was then their highest ever FIFA ranking of 27th in August 1993 and came close to qualifying for the 1994 World Cup tournament. The qualifying group started disastrously with a 5–1 defeat away to Romania. However, Yorath turned things around with victories over the Faroe Isles, Belgium and Cyprus. Needing to win their final game of the qualifying group at home to Romania, Paul Bodin's penalty hit the crossbar with the scores level at 1–1. Romania went on to win 2–1. Following the failure to qualify Yorath's contract as manager was not renewed, angering many Welsh fans and John Toshack, then manager of Real Sociedad, was appointed as a part-time manager. However, Toshack resigned after just one game – a 3–1 defeat to Norway with the team being booed off the pitch in Cardiff by the Welsh fans still upset at the dismissal of Yorath.

Yorath joined Cardiff City as general manager in 1994, after speculation that he would become manager of Middlesbrough in May that year, and assumed control of team affairs in November of that year when manager Eddie May was sacked. However, his time in the hotseat with the Bluebirds was brief, and he was sacked in March 1995 with the club headed for relegation. In April of the same year, Yorath took over as coach of the Lebanon national team, and helped them rise 60 places in the FIFA World Rankings before leaving in 1997.

Between 1997 and 2000 he worked as a coach at Huddersfield Town and Bradford City, before joining Sheffield Wednesday as assistant to Paul Jewell. Yorath retained his position when Jewell was dismissed, and eventually became manager in 2001. However, he resigned in 2002 after a run of five defeats in six league matches saw Wednesday drop into the relegation zone.

In June 2008, Yorath returned to football when he was appointed the director of football at Isthmian League Premier Division side Margate, where his brother Dai and nephew Dean had both played. On 21 November 2008, he was appointed manager of the club after Barry Ashby was sacked. However, Yorath resigned as Margate manager on 24 September 2009 following a run of disappointing results, leaving Neville Southall in temporary charge of the team.

Personal life
Yorath's autobiography, published in 2004, is titled Hard Man, Hard Knocks.

Honours

Player
Leeds United
 First Division: 1973–74

Manager
Lebanon
 Pan Arab Games third place: 1997

References

Further reading

External links

Profile on NASL Jerseys

1950 births
Living people
People from Grangetown, Cardiff
Footballers from Cardiff
Welsh footballers
Association football midfielders
Leeds United F.C. players
Coventry City F.C. players
Tottenham Hotspur F.C. players
Vancouver Whitecaps (1974–1984) players
Bradford City A.F.C. players
Swansea City A.F.C. players
English Football League players
North American Soccer League (1968–1984) players
North American Soccer League (1968–1984) indoor players
Wales under-23 international footballers
Wales international footballers
Welsh expatriate footballers
Welsh expatriate sportspeople in Canada
Expatriate soccer players in Canada
Welsh football managers
Bradford City A.F.C. non-playing staff
Swansea City A.F.C. managers
Wales national football team managers
Bradford City A.F.C. managers
Cardiff City F.C. managers
Lebanon national football team managers
Huddersfield Town A.F.C. non-playing staff
Sheffield Wednesday F.C. managers
English Football League managers
Isthmian League managers
Welsh expatriate football managers
Welsh expatriate sportspeople in Lebanon
Expatriate football managers in Lebanon
FA Cup Final players